Mario Suárez (January 29, 1926 in Maracaibo, Zulia – November 14, 2018) was a Venezuelan folk singer.

Biography 
He was twice elected the president of the Asociación Venezolana de Artistas de la Escena.  His albums include Moliendo Café and La música más pura y bella de Venezuela.

References 

  Mario Suárez at Glorias del Folklore foundation

1926 births
2018 deaths
People from Maracaibo
Venezuelan folk singers
Suarez, Mario